WQUE-FM (93.3 FM, "Q93.3") is a Mainstream Urban radio outlet in New Orleans, Louisiana. The station, which is owned by iHeartMedia, Inc., operates at 93.3 MHz with an ERP of 100 kW. Its current slogan is "#1 for Hip-Hop & R&B". Its transmitter is located in New Orleans' Algiers district, and its studios are located downtown.

WQUE was originally WDSU-FM, the FM sister of WDSU-TV until 1971, when it was sold to new owners who turned it into an AC format. By the early 1980s, WQUE-FM switched to a Top 40/CHR format and adopted the "Q93" handle, which they continue with today after they evolved to its current format in 1992. WQUE is one of the most popular stations among African-American youth in the New Orleans area. From 2006 to 2014, it was the home of the Steve Harvey Morning Show, which now airs on sister WYLD-FM (which formerly aired Tom Joyner).  In January 2014, it became the home of The Breakfast Club.

WQUE-FM-HD2 

WQUE-HD2 is broadcasting with hip-hop as All My Jams Top 20.

External links
Q93's website

WQUE-FM
Mainstream urban radio stations in the United States
Radio stations established in 1949
1949 establishments in Louisiana
IHeartMedia radio stations